Ericameria palmeri, or Palmer's goldenbush, is a North American species of flowering shrubs in the family Asteraceae. It is native to southern California in the United States and to the state of Baja California in Mexico.

Ericameria palmeri is a branching shrub sometimes as much as 400 cm (over 13 feet) tall. Leaves are linear to narrowly oblanceolate. One plant can produce many small, yellow flower heads, each containing 2–8 ray florets and 6–20 disc florets.

Varieties
 Ericameria palmeri var. pachylepis (H.M.Hall) G.L.Nesom - California from northern San Diego County north to Kern and San Luis Obispo Counties
 Ericameria palmeri var. palmeri - northern Baja California; California (San Diego Co, Orange Co, western Riverside Co, southwestern San Bernardino Co; isolated populations north of Calabasas in Los Angeles Co and southeast of Lake Isabella in Kern Co)

References

External links
Santa Monica Mountains National Recreation Area, Ericameria palmeri var. pachylepis  photos

palmeri
Flora of California
Flora of Baja California
Natural history of the California chaparral and woodlands
Natural history of the California Coast Ranges
Natural history of the Peninsular Ranges
Natural history of the Transverse Ranges
Plants described in 1876
Taxa named by Asa Gray
Flora without expected TNC conservation status